Specs Appeal is the tenth album by British instrumental (and sometimes vocal) group the Shadows, released in 1975 through Columbia (EMI). The album included all six songs that the group had performed in that year's A Song for Europe.

Track listing

Personnel
Hank Marvin - Electric and acoustic guitars and vocals
Bruce Welch - Electric and acoustic guitars and vocals
John Farrar - Electric and acoustic guitars and vocals and ARP synthesizer on "Like Strangers"
Brian Bennett - Drums and percussion and ARP synthesizer on "Like Strangers"
With
Dave Richmond - Bass guitar
Alan Tarney - Bass guitar
John Fiddy - Orchestral accompaniment
Graham Todd - Keyboards on "God Only Knows"

Charts

References 

1975 albums
EMI Columbia Records albums
The Shadows albums
Albums with cover art by Hipgnosis